The 2004 Ondrej Nepela Memorial was the 12th edition of an annual senior-level international figure skating competition held in Bratislava, Slovakia. It took place between September 23 and 26, 2004 at the Vladimir Dzurilla Ice Rink. Skaters competed in four disciplines: men's singles, ladies' singles, pair skating, and ice dancing. The competition is named for 1972 Olympic gold medalist Ondrej Nepela.

Results

Men

Ladies

Pairs

Ice dancing

External links
 12th Ondrej Nepela Memorial

Ondrej Nepela Memorial, 2004
Ondrej Nepela Memorial
Ondrej Nepela Memorial, 2004